Bara Gali is one of the mountain resort towns of the Galyat and Ayubia National Park, at an altitude of . It is located in the Abbottabad District of  Khyber Pakhtunkhwa province in northern Pakistan.

Bara Gali is the summer campus of the University of Peshawar.

History
During British Rule, Bara Gali was a small cantonment that was occupied in the hot summer months by one of the British mountain batteries which were stationed at Rawalpindi in the winter.

References

Galyat of Pakistan
Populated places in Abbottabad District
Hill stations in Pakistan